Khiching is an ancient city and largely in ruins is situated in Panchpir sub-division of Mayurbhanj district in Odisha State of India. It is the location of the Kichakeshwari Temple made from black stone.

Khiching is located about 50 km east of Keonjhargarh city 24 km west of Karanjia.There are several villages in the vicinity, including Sukruli, Kesana, Naupana, Kakharupana, Salabana, Viratagada, Kichakagada. Another nearby village is Singda. The major festival in Khiching is Sivarathri, which is celebrated over seven days.
The major tourist attraction of Khiching is the Temple Of Maa Kichakeswari. The temple was constructed during the year 920/925. Goddess Kichakeshwari, which was not only ishtadevata and kuladevi of Bhanj dynasty but also the State deity of Princely State of Mayurbhanj ruled by them. The temple suffered in the hand of Vandals. King of Mayurbhanj, Maharaja Pratap Chandra Bhanjdeo reconstructed the temple in the year 1934 spending an approximate amount of  85,000.00. Main temple remains closed between 12 noon to 3 PM.
There is a museum constructed by Maharaja Purna Chandra Bhanjdeo in the year 1922.

Description
The ancient capital of the Bhanja rules, Khiching lies about 190 km away from Balasore and 130 km from Baripada. Scores of temples dominate the place, some of which are still in active worship. The predominant deity of Khiching is Kichakeswari, the most sacred Goddess of the Mayurbhanj chiefs. The temple dedicated to her is built entirely of chlorite slabs and unique of it kind in India. The sculptures are beautiful.a museum here boasts of highly important historical specimens of sculpture and art.

References

External links
India Profile page

Villages in Mayurbhanj district